Mercia Inshore Search and Rescue (MISAR), also known as Mercia Rescue, is a water rescue team operating from the marina in Upton-upon-Severn, Worcestershire, England.

Mercia Rescue is a registered charity, staffed by volunteers reliant upon donations. The team are currently developing an NVQ qualification in water-borne rescue skills that will be made available to other rescue organisations in the near future.

Training in boat handling and VHF Marine Radio is to RYA standards, and Swiftwater rescue training to the American National Fire Protection Association (NFPA) 1670 Standard on Operations and Training for Technical Rescue is undertaken with the Rescue3 company in Bala, Wales. All qualifications are encompassed within a unique 10 unit training programme designed to maximise the skills, knowledge and professionalism of the working crews.

MISAR is a partner of the Environment Agency for the Upton flood barrier scheme

See also
 Royal National Lifeboat Institution covers the River Severn downstream of Avonmouth
 Severn Area Rescue Association covers the River Severn upstream of Avonmouth to Wyre Forest

External links 
 www.merciarescue.org

River Severn
Organisations based in Worcestershire
Volunteer search and rescue in the United Kingdom
Sea rescue organisations of the United Kingdom